Davidovich is a Russian and Belarusian language patronymic surname and patronymic meaning "son of David".

Notable people with the surname include:

Alejandro Davidovich Fokina (born 1999),  Spanish tennis player.
Bella Davidovich (born 1928), American pianist
Benjamin Davidovich (born 1930), Israeli goalkeeper
Lolita Davidovich (born 1961), Canadian actress
Maayan Davidovich (born 1988), Israeli Olympic windsurfer
Nir Davidovich (born 1976), Israeli goalkeeper
Paul Davidovich (1737–1814), Austrian soldier

See also
Dawidowicz
Davidović

Russian-language surnames
Patronymic surnames
Surnames from given names